The 2015 National Ringette League Playoffs were the postseason tournament of 2014-15 National Ringette League season. Cambridge Turbos defeated the Richmond Hill Lighting to win the 4th title.

Regular Season Standing

Format 

Same as 2014 Playoff except without phrase in parenthesis.

Knockout stage

(3) Ottawa vs (10) Gatineau 
Game 1

Ottawa leads the series 1-0

Game 2

Ottawa wins the series 2–0

(4) Gloucester vs (9) Atlantic 
Game 1

Gloucester leads the series 1-0

Game 2

Gloucester wins the series 2–0

(5) Richmond Hill vs (8) Bourassa 
Game 1

Bourassa leads the series 1-0

Game 2

The series ties 1-1

Game 3

Richmond Hill wins the series 2-1

(6) Waterloo vs (7) Lac St.Louis 
Game 1

Waterloo leads the series 1-0

Game 2

The series ties 1-1

Game 3

Waterloo wins the series 2-1

Elite Eight 
All games were played at Casman Centre, Suncor Community Leisure Center, Frank Lacroix Arena, all located Fort McMurray, Alberta and only game between Richmond Hill and Edmonton played at Fort McKay Arena, Fort McKay, Alberta from March 30 to April 3.
x indicates clinches semifinal.
y indicates clinches final directly.

Semifinal 
Richmond Hill vs. Edmonton

Richmond Hill goes to the final.

Final 
Cambridge vs. Richmond Hill

Roster 

Richmond Hill Lighting
 van Frankfoort, Lana
 Reaman, Shae-Lynn
 Duguay, Karen
 McWilliams, Karen
 Jones, Jessica
 Stinson, Shelby
 Hurren, Beth
 Munro, Carling
 Hodgson, Samantha
 Johnston, Kristin
 Simone, Melissa
 Voss, Erica
 Gibson, Megan
 Kiviaho, Erika
 Miller, Ashley (goalie)
Cambridge Turbos
 Findlay, Melissa
 Campbell, Taylor
 Adams, Sheri
 Gaudet, Jennifer
 Musetti (Nosal), Samantha
 Dupuis, Jenna
 Granger, Sydney
 Wise, Jaclyn
 Walden, Brittany
 Gaudet, Jacqueline
 Nosal, Paige
 Barey, Nadia
 McCullough, Samantha
 Jasper, Elyssa
 Pittaway, Meghan (goalie)

Leaders 
Player except goalie
Goal 
 East: Jacqueline Gaudet (16, CAM)
 West: Jamie Bell (12, EDM)
Assist
 East: Emily Bakker (20, WAT)
 West: Shaundra Bruvall (14, CGY)
 Point
 East: Julie Blanchette (30, MTL)
 West: Shaundra Bruvall (22, CGY)
Goalie
Saving %
East Veronique Simard, Ashley Miller (both are .913, BOU and RH respectively)
West Bobbi Mattson (.909, CGY)
Goals against average
East Jasmine LeBlanc (2.50, GLO)
West Breanna Beck (3.90, EDM)
Win
East Meghan Pittaway (5, CAM)
West Breanna Beck, Bobbi Mattson (both are 4, EDM and CGY respectively)

References 

National Ringette League